BQS may refer to:

 Ignatyevo Airport (IATA airport code: BQS; ICAO airport code: UHBB), Amur Oblast, Russia
 Bosmun language (ISO 639 language code: bqs)
 Basti Qutab railway station (rail station code: BQS) in Pakistan
 Bus shelter (bus queue shelter)
 Bunker Quantity Survey, a measure of fuel delivered to a ship
 1,4-dihydrobenzoquinone-2-sulfonic acid (BQS) in electrochemistry for flow battery

See also

 
 BOS (disambiguation)
 BQ (disambiguation)